Saija Katariina Tarkki  (born 29 December 1982) is a Finnish retired ice hockey player and the former general manager of Oulun Kärpät Naiset in the Naisten Liiga. She represented  at four Winter Olympics and eight IIHF Women's World Championships, winning bronze in the women's ice hockey tournament at the 2010 Winter Olympics in Vancouver and at the World Championship tournaments in 2004, 2008, and 2009.

Personal life
Tarkki is married to former Liiga goaltender Tuomas Tarkki.

Career statistics

References

External links
 
 
 Saija Sirviö's profile, from http://www.vancouver2010.com; retrieved 2010-02-25.

1982 births
Living people
Finnish expatriate ice hockey players in Sweden
Finnish women's ice hockey defencemen
Ice hockey players at the 2002 Winter Olympics
Ice hockey players at the 2006 Winter Olympics
Ice hockey players at the 2010 Winter Olympics
Ice hockey players at the 2014 Winter Olympics
Medalists at the 2010 Winter Olympics
Olympic bronze medalists for Finland
Olympic ice hockey players of Finland
Olympic medalists in ice hockey
Oulun Kärpät Naiset players
Modo Hockey players
Sportspeople from Oulu